The  was a commuter electric multiple unit (EMU) train type formerly owned by the third-sector railway company Chiba New Town Railway and operated by the Hokuso Railway on the Hokuso Line in Japan from 1984 until 20 March 2017.

Formation
The two eight-car trains, 9008 and 9018, were formed as follows, with six motored ("M") cars and two non-powered trailer ("T") cars.

The cars of set 9008 were numbered in sequence from 9001 to 9008, and the cars of set 9018 were numbered in sequence from 9011 to 9018. The two M1 cars each had two lozenge-type pantograph, while the M1' car had one.

History
The trains were initially classified as "2000 series", and formed as six-car sets. The two six-car train sets were lengthened to eight cars each in 1991, coinciding with the start of inter-running services to and from the Toei Asakusa Line. In 1994, the trains were reclassified 9000 series to avoid confusion with the Keikyu 2000 series trains on the Keikyu Main Line, over which the trains also inter-ran.

Withdrawal
Set 9008 was withdrawn in 2013, and set 9018 was withdrawn following its last day in service on 20 March 2017, replaced by 9800 series set 9808.

References

Electric multiple units of Japan
Train-related introductions in 1984